Diego Germán Martínez (born August 5, 1981 in Montevideo, Uruguay) is a Uruguayan footballer currently playing for C.A. Bella Vista.

Teams
  Defensor Sporting 2001
  Plaza Colonia 2002–2003
  Sportivo Cerrito 2004–2008
  Sud América 2008
  Cerro 2009–2010
  Sportivo Luqueño 2011–2012
  Sud América 2012
  Bella Vista 2012–present

References
 Profile at BDFA 

1981 births
Living people
Uruguayan footballers
Uruguayan expatriate footballers
Categoría Primera A players
Paraguayan Primera División players
Defensor Sporting players
Sportivo Cerrito players
C.A. Cerro players
Sportivo Luqueño players
C.A. Bella Vista players
Expatriate footballers in Colombia
Expatriate footballers in Paraguay
Association football goalkeepers